A. Soundararajan is an Indian politician and was a member of the 14th Tamil Nadu Legislative Assembly from the Perambur constituency in Chennai District. He represented the Communist Party of India (Marxist) party. He is working with Congress of Indian Trade Union.

The elections of 2016 resulted in his constituency being won by P. Vetriivel.

References 

Communist Party of India (Marxist) politicians from Tamil Nadu
Tamil Nadu MLAs 2011–2016
Living people
Year of birth missing (living people)